Birmingham Snow Hill, also known as Snow Hill station, is a railway station in Birmingham City Centre.

The station has been rebuilt several times since the first station at Snow Hill, a temporary wooden structure, was opened in 1852; it was rebuilt as a permanent station in 1871 and then rebuilt again on a much grander scale during 1906–1912. The electrification of the main line from London to New Street in the 1960s saw New Street favoured over Snow Hill, most of whose services were withdrawn in the late 1960s. This led to the station's eventual closure in 1972 and its demolition five years later. After fifteen years of closure, a new Snow Hill station, the present incarnation, was built; it reopened in 1987.

The present Snow Hill station has three platforms for National Rail trains. When it was originally reopened in 1987, it had four, but one was later converted in 1999 for use as a terminus for West Midlands Metro trams on the line from Wolverhampton. This tram terminus closed in October 2015, in order for the extension of the West Midlands Metro through Birmingham city centre to be connected; this included a dedicated embankment for trams alongside the station and included a new through stop serving Snow Hill.

History

Early history
The site of the station was formerly occupied by Oppenheim's Glassworks. This was demolished, but many parts of the building and machinery are believed to be buried underneath the station and car park, and during recent development work alongside the station the area was designated as a site of archaeological importance by Birmingham City Council. Originally called Birmingham Station, its name was changed to Great Charles Street station, and then Livery Street Station. It was finally renamed Snow Hill in 1858, and the Great Western Hotel was added in 1863.

It was never intended to be the main station, but the railway was prevented from reaching its original intended terminus at Curzon Street; London and North Western Railway's engineer Robert Stephenson and solicitor Samuel Carter argued in parliament that there would be safety risks in rival companies sharing the congested connection into their station. The original station was a simple temporary wooden structure, consisting of a large wooden shed covering the platforms. In 1871 it was rebuilt, and replaced with a permanent structure. The 1871 station had two through platforms, and bay platforms at the Wolverhampton end, covered by an arched roof. Access to the station was from Livery Street from the side. Trains from the south arrived through Snow Hill Tunnel, built by the cut-and-cover method, and in a cutting from Temple Row to Snow Hill. The cutting was roofed over in 1872 and the Great Western Arcade built on top.

To cope with expanding traffic. Snow Hill station was rebuilt again on a much larger scale between 1906 and 1912. The new station building was intended to compete with New Street, which at the time was a much grander building than it is today. The rebuilt station contained lavish facilities, such as a large booking hall with an arched glass roof, and lavish waiting rooms with oak bars. The main platform area was covered by a large glass and steel overall roof. It consisted of two large Island platforms, containing four through platforms, and four bay platforms for terminating trains at the northern end. The through platforms were long enough to accommodate two trains at a time, and scissors crossings allowed trains to pull in front, or out from behind of other trains stood in a platform, effectively creating a 10 platform station. The line north from Snow Hill towards Hockley was quadrupled at the same time, however the cost of widening the twin track Snow Hill tunnel at the southern end was considered prohibitive. There was not enough capacity through the tunnel to accommodate all of the services, and so, as a solution,  was built as an "overflow" station at the opposite end of the tunnel to take terminating local trains towards Leamington Spa and Stratford-upon-Avon. The Great Western Hotel was closed at the same time (as guests complained of being kept awake by goods trains running underneath) and converted into railway offices, and a passenger entrance was provided on Colmore Row, which became the station's main entrance.

Historic services

At its height, many trains that now run into New Street station ran into Snow Hill, along with some that no longer run. Services included:

  – service transferred to New Street in 1967, and later abandoned altogether. The London service was restored in the early 1990s, but now to London Marylebone - making this Snow Hill's only long-distance service.
  via Wolverhampton, Wrexham and  – this was on the old GWR route from London Paddington. British Railways ended this service before closing Snow Hill in 1967.
A pioneering diesel railcar service with a buffet commenced running in July 1934 between Snow Hill and Cardiff, running non-stop through Stratford, with only two stops at Gloucester and Newport. This was the first long-distance diesel express service in Britain. The railcar service ran until 1946, when it was replaced with a conventional steam service, which continued until it was diverted via New Street in 1962.
British Railways later closed the line between Stratford and Cheltenham in 1976.

Station masters

James Kelly 1852 - 1855 
George Wasborough Andrews 1855 - 1863 (formerly station master at Swindon)
Frederick John Cross 1863 - 1882
Charles William Noble 1883 - 1888 (afterwards station master at Reading)
Henry Larkham 1888 - ca. 1892 (formerly station master at Reading)
A.R. Russell ca. 1895 - 1897
Henry Herring 1897 - 1921 (formerly station master at Wednesbury)
F.A. Taylor 1921 - 1932
T. Blea 1932 - 1936 (formerly station master at Fishguard)
Arthur Elsden 1936 - 1950 (formerly depot master at Old Oak Common)
H.C. Swancutt 1950 - 1957 (formerly station master at Oxford, afterwards station master at Cardiff Central)
Walter Taylor 1957 - 1960
R. George W. Windsor 1960 - 1963 (formerly station master at Newquay)
George Smith 1964 - ????

Closure
As late as the mid-1960s Snow Hill was still a major station handling millions of passengers annually; in 1964 Snow Hill handled 7.5 million passengers, compared to 10.2 million at New Street. However the electrification of the rival West Coast Main Line into New Street, meant that British Railways decided to concentrate all services into Birmingham into one station, and Snow Hill was seen as being an unnecessary duplication. In 1966 the decision was taken to end main line services through Snow Hill once electrification of the WCML was complete, and divert most of its remaining services through New Street. 

Long-distance services through Snow Hill ceased in March 1967. Snow Hill tunnel closed to all traffic the following year, with the last train running on 2 March 1968. Local trains towards Leamington Spa and Stratford upon Avon were then terminated at Moor Street. Services to London, the West Country, Stourbridge and Shrewsbury were diverted to New Street, and the branch to Dudley was closed. With this, as most passenger facilities in the station were withdrawn and virtually the entire site became disused save for one bay platform, Snow Hill then acquired the unfortunate title of "the largest unstaffed railway halt in the country".

Following closure, the derelict station was used for several years as a car park. It enjoyed a brief moment of fame in 1976 when it was the setting for a fight scene in the locally set BBC TV drama series Gangsters. However, despite a public outcry, the Snow Hill building was not preserved. The Colmore Row façade was demolished in 1969, and the rest of the station largely demolished in 1977, when the dangerous state of the building was revealed.  The ironwork of the station roof was badly corroded in several places, and the unstable ground and foundations on which the station had been built were causing it to slide downhill. A few items, including the original gates and booking hall sign, were saved and later used in the Moor Street restoration.

Rebirth

The West Midlands Passenger Transport Authority had adopted a policy to restore cross-city rail services through Snow Hill since the 1970s, a project which was completed in two phases.

The first phase was completed on 5 October 1987, when the newly rebuilt Snow Hill station opened for services to the south, along with Snow Hill tunnel. The rebuilt station is on a smaller scale than its Edwardian predecessor, built with two island platforms, giving four platform faces. The station's architecture is functional rather than ornate, a multi-storey car park stands over the main platform area, meaning artificial lighting is required on the platforms. Like its predecessor, the main entrance is on Colmore Row. Some parts of the original station are still visible (notably the now-sealed entrance, with GWR crest, in Livery Street).

Services at Moor Street, where these services had previously terminated, were switched from the former terminal platforms, which then closed, on to two newly built through platforms, at the southern end of Snow Hill tunnel, making a through station adjacent to the tunnel mouth.

In May 1993 Network SouthEast reintroduced limited-stop services to London, initially on a two-hourly frequency, routed to Marylebone instead of the pre-closure destination of Paddington. The service proved popular and was increased to an hourly frequency the following year. Chiltern Railways took over the service after privatisation.

The second phase of the Snow Hill reopening project was completed on 24 September 1995, when the Birmingham to Worcester via Kidderminster Line was reopened to Snow Hill. This allowed the resumption of services to Worcester Shrub Hill via Stourbridge Junction and Kidderminster. The "Jewellery Line" project involved reopening the line between Smethwick West and Snow Hill, along with three new stations (The Hawthorns and Jewellery Quarter).

In 1999, the line to Wolverhampton was reopened as a light rail (tram) line, the Midland Metro.

Work began on a new entrance on Livery Street to give commuters access to the lower Snow Hill and Jewellery Quarter part of the city centre in 2005, but it did not open for business until March 2011. The work had a projected cost of £9.94 million, but due to Centro's failure to apply for planning permission, and severe technical difficulties, the cost rose to at least £17 million. Although construction and interior finishes' works were largely complete by December 2010, legal disputes between London Midland, Network Rail and Centro caused delay to the opening of the entrance by over a year.
The former tram terminus platform is intended to be returned for use for mainline trains as a fourth platform. However as of September 2020, little work has been conducted other than disconnecting and partial lifting of the former tram line. The fourth platform is now expected to be completed by 2026.

Station Cat Memorial

In remembrance of a cat kept at the station before its closure, a memorial tile was installed during the works for the reopening. During later refurbishment works in 2014 care was taken that the tile would stay in situ.

Services

The station is managed by West Midlands Trains and services are provided by West Midlands Trains and Chiltern Railways. There is a small set of sidings at the Hockley end of the station, which can be reached from Platform 1 only. All platforms can be used in either direction; generally platforms 1 or 2 are used for trains heading north, platform 2 is used for trains terminating at the station and platform 3 is used for trains going south.

Occasional steam-hauled special trains use the station.

Chiltern Railways

Snow Hill is served by regular Chiltern services to and from London Marylebone. Some Chiltern services continue beyond Birmingham to Kidderminster. The Chiltern service is:

West Midlands Railway
Local services from Snow Hill, like most local services in the West Midlands, are supported by Transport for West Midlands. They are operated by West Midlands Trains using the West Midlands Railway brand. There are six West Midlands Railway trains per hour (tph) passing through Snow Hill in each direction, running as follows:

Eastbound:

 3 trains per hour to :
of which one continues to  via the North Warwickshire Line.
 3 trains per hour to 
of which one continues to  via Hatton North Curve and Bearley West Junction onto the North Warwickshire Line.
some peak hour West Midlands Railway services continue from Dorridge to Leamington Spa

Westbound:

 6 trains per hour to :
of which four continue to :
of which two continue to 
(services beyond Worcester, to Malvern and Hereford are irregular, generally about one per hour)

Tram stops

Former terminus
From 1999 until 2015, Snow Hill was the terminus of the Midland Metro Line 1 from Wolverhampton. Opening on 31 May 1999, it occupied the space previously used by platform 4 of the main line station. The stop had two platforms, and was approached by a short section of single track.

The Snow Hill terminus was officially closed on 24 October 2015, and the approach line disconnected, in order to allow the new extension into Birmingham City Centre to be connected to the existing line. It is therefore the only Midland Metro stop so far to have been permanently closed. Trams terminated at St Paul's until the first part of the extension was brought into service as far as Bull Street on 6 December 2015.

Current through stop

As part of the extension, a new through Snow Hill stop at a different location opened outside the station and further west, on the existing viaduct near the Livery Street entrance. Funding for this was confirmed in the October 2010 Comprehensive Spending Review. A new viaduct was built alongside the station as part of the Snowhill development to carry the tram lines into the city centre. This allows platform 4 to be returned to main line use in the future.

The new Snow Hill through stop was opened on 2 June 2016, two days after the full opening of the city-centre extension to New Street. However, the necessary works to allow passenger access to the stop from the street or adjacent railway station had not at the time been completed, meaning passengers could only access the stop by a walkway alongside the tracks from the city centre. Stairs and a lift connecting the stop to the street below were completed in September 2017.

In January 2017, the stop was renamed St Chads as the name Snow Hill was considered misleading for passengers using the mainline station due to the new stop's lack of direct interchange with the railway station, and the closer proximity of Bull Street stop. The stop is now advertised as an alternate interchange to the mainline station with Bull Street being the main interchange.

In December 2018 it was announced that a new entrance would be constructed at Snow Hill station, by opening up an arch in the railway viaduct. This will allow direct interchange between St Chads tram stop and the railway station. The work is due to begin in Summer 2019.

Accidents and incidents

In October 1854, a derailed engine fell into Great Charles Street, below the station.

See also

 Birmingham International railway station
 List of Midland Metro stations
 Transport in Birmingham

References

Bibliography

 Birmingham Snow Hill - A Great Station : Ian Baxter and Richard Harper (Published by the authors in conjunction with Kidderminster Railway Museum) : 2002

Further reading

External links

 1890 Ordnance Survey map of the station
 Article on this station from Rail Around Birmingham & the West Midlands
 Article on the Metro station from Rail Around Birmingham & the West Midlands
 A pictorial record of the station from 1871 to 1967 and the locomotives that used the station from Warwickshire's Railways
 The History of Birmingham Snow Hill Warwickshire Railways

West Midlands Metro stops
Railway stations in Birmingham, West Midlands
DfT Category C1 stations
Former Great Western Railway stations
Railway stations in Great Britain opened in 1852
Railway stations in Great Britain closed in 1972
Railway stations in Great Britain opened in 1987
Railway stations served by Chiltern Railways
Railway stations served by West Midlands Trains
Buildings and structures demolished in 1977
Reopened railway stations in Great Britain
1852 establishments in England
1872 disestablishments in England
1987 establishments in England